Emma Trelles is a Latina poet, writer, professor, and current poet laureate of Santa Barbara, California.

Life
Trelles earned an MFA from Florida International University in the 1990s, where she was mentored by the poet Campbell McGrath and fiction writer John Dufresne. Trelles is a professor of composition and creative writing at Santa Barbara City College.

A contributor to the Best American Poetry blog, Trelles's poetry and prose have been anthologized in Ocho, Gulf Stream, Verse Daily, MiPOesias Magazine, The Rumpus and Tigertail: A South Florida Annual. Her journalism has been featured in the Miami Herald and the Sun-Sentinel. 
Her work appeared in Best American Poetry 2013.

Trelles has been the recipient of fellowships from the CantoMundo and the Florida Division of Cultural Affairs. Her book Tropicalia, was selected by Silvia Curbelo for the 2010 Andrés Montoya Poetry Prize. Tropicalia takes its title from the 1960s Brazilian arts movement of the same name.

Works
Tropicalia, University of Notre Dame Press, 2011, 
Little Spells,  CreateSpace, 2008,

Non-fiction
Miami, Longstreet, 2001,

References

External links
 Author website
 Trelles interviewed with Grace Cavalieri on the Library of Congress' Poet and the Poem program.
 Review of Tropicalia at Post No Ills Magazine
 Best American Poetry Blog

20th-century American poets
21st-century American poets
Living people
American women journalists
American women poets
American writers of Cuban descent
Hispanic and Latino American poets
Hispanic and Latino American women journalists
Poets from Florida
Journalists from Florida
Year of birth missing (living people)
20th-century American non-fiction writers
21st-century American non-fiction writers
20th-century American women writers
21st-century American women writers